Biłgoraj  (Bilgoray) is a town in south-eastern Poland with 25,838 inhabitants as of December 2021. Since 1999 it has been situated in Lublin Voivodeship; it was previously located in Zamość Voivodeship (1975–1998). It is located south of Lublin and it is also the capital of Biłgoraj County. Historically, the town belongs to Lesser Poland, and is located in southeastern corner of the province, near the border with another historic land, Red Ruthenia. Biłgoraj is surrounded by a forest, with three rivers flowing through it.

Etymology
The name of the town probably comes from a hill called Biely Goraj, on which Biłgoraj was founded in the 16th century.

Geography

Biłgoraj lies in northern part of Sandomierz Basin, near Roztocze. The town is surrounded by Solska Forest,  from Roztocze National Park. The town is crossed by four small rivers: Biała Łada, Czarna Łada, Osa and Próchnica. Biłgoraj lies on the elevations ranging from 184 to 212 meters above sea level.

History

From the 16th century until 1918
The area of current Biłgoraj was covered by dense forests and swamps, where establishment of human settlements was difficult. In the first half of the 16th century, local noble family of Gorajski built first settlements in this sparsely populated corner of Lesser Poland. At that time, the villages of Gromada, Dąbrowica and Olendrów were founded.

The town of Biłgoraj was officially established in 1570 by Adam Gorajski, and incorporated by King Stefan Batory at Lviv on September 10, 1578. Its main market square was placed on the hill called Bialy Goraj. The town, surrounded by rivers, held a strategic position and was easy to defend. Biłgoraj quickly grew, due to a busy merchant road from Jarosław to Lublin. Biłgoraj town was surrounded by a defensive wall with watchtowers, although the town's further growth extended into suburbs. A bridge was built over the Biala Lada. Until 1693 Biłgoraj remained in the hands of the Gorajski family. Throughout the 18th century, it belonged either to the Szczuka family or the Potocki family. Most houses in Biłgoraj were made of wood, which resulted in several fires. Furthermore, the wars of the mid-17th century destroyed the town twice; first in 1648, when the town was burned by the Cossacks of Bohdan Khmelnytsky; then in 1655, by the Swedes during the deluge.

Biłgoraj was an important center of the Bar Confederation, and in the area of the town several skirmishes took place between the Poles and the Russians. After the Partition of Poland, Biłgoraj was annexed by the Austrian Empire, and in 1809 it became part of Duchy of Warsaw (since 1815, Russian-controlled Congress Kingdom). In the late 18th century its population was 3,000; and grew to 6,000 by 1865. At that time, it was the third biggest town of Lublin Governorate, after Lublin and Hrubieszów.

In 1806 following the Partitions, Biłgoraj – which was still privately owned and on the verge of bankruptcy – was purchased by the local entrepreneur named Stanisław Nowakowski, who built for himself a palace in Biłgoraj's district of Roznowka, modelled after Warsaw's famous Łazienki Palace. The town remained in the hands of the Nowakowski family until 1850, when it was sold to the Tsarist official Nikolay Platonov (Mikołaj Płatonow), and in 1864 appropriated by the government as the seat of a county. During the January Uprising, several skirmishes took place Biłgoraj and its vicinity.

1918 to 1939
In 1918 Biłgoraj returned to newly created Second Polish Republic. Its population in 1921 reached 5,600. In 1928, electrification reached the town, but Biłgoraj nevertheless remained poor and underdeveloped, where most houses were constructed of wood. Historically, the town was a center of a large Jewish community, whose population in 1931 reached 4,596.

WWII and The Holocaust 
On September 11, 1939, a unit of German-minority Fifth column agents set fire to the town, which destroyed most of it. A few days later Nazi German troops entered the town and immediately organized anti-Jewish pogroms.  Furthermore, the Luftwaffe bombed Biłgoraj twice (September 8 and 14). On September 15–16, 1939 units of Kraków Army and Lublin Army retreating towards Tomaszow Lubelski, fought the Wehrmacht in the Battle of Biłgoraj. The Germans tried to capture the towns several times, but they did not manage to do so until September 17, after yet another fire. On September 28, units of the Red Army entered Biłgoraj, but they retreated after a few weeks, and the town became part of the Nazi-ruled General Government.  On June 25, 1940, a ghetto was established.

During the German occupation, Biłgoraj was an important center of the resistance. Local units of the Home Army and other clandestine organizations took part in the Zamość Uprising. Germans knew well that Solska Forest was filled with Polish fighters, and the Poles frequently attacked German units in Biłgoraj. The most famous incident of this kind took place on September 24, 1943, when a Home Army unit under Tadeusz Sztumberk-Rychter attacked Biłgoraj's prison, releasing 72 inmates, including Ludwik Ehrlich.

There was also Jewish partisan resistance in the Bilgoraj area. On August 17 and August 26, 1943, two other clashes are recorded: one in the village of Podgranicznik, 30 km. northwest of Krasnystaw, in which two Jews were killed; and another in the village of Poreba, 26 km. east of Bilgoraj, between a large partisan unit and the Nazi German Truppenzpolizei.

Six transports to Belzec gas chambers took place from Bilgoraj: 500 Jews in April, 1942; 1,000 Jews in May, 1942; 1,200 Jews in August, 1942; 5,000 Jews in September, 1942; 500 Jews in October, 1942; and 2,000 Jews in November, 1942.  On Jan. 15, 1943, the last 27 survivors who had remained in hiding were shot. Very few of the Jewish partisans from Bilgoraj survived the  war due to great efforts by the Nazi Germans to hunt them down in the woods.

Most of Biłgoraj's Jews were murdered in the Holocaust. Only around 50 Jews survived the war. The Germans left Biłgoraj on July 24, 1944. During the war, 80% of the town was destroyed, and it lost 50% of its population.

Post-war
After 1945 Biłgoraj was rebuilt, becoming by 1975 a regional industrial center. The town was a part of the Lublin Voivodeship from 1945 to 1975, Zamość Voivodeship from 1975 to 1998, and once again in Lublin Voivodeship since 1999.

Districts
Biłgoraj is divided into twelve districts:
 I. Śródmieście
 1. Dist. Przemysłowa
 II. Nadstawna
 III. Roztocze
 2. Dist. Łąkowa I
 3. Dist. Łąkowa II
 IV. Bojary
 4. Dist. Bojary
 V. Rapy
 VI. Sitarska - Kępy
 5. Dist. Sitarska I
 6. Dist. Sitarska II
 7. Dist. Sportowa
 8. Dist. Kępy
 VII. Ogrody
 VIII. Piaski
 9. Dist. Prusa
 10. Dist. Leśnik
 IX. Puszcza Solska
 11. Dist. Sienkiewicza
 12. Dist. Krzeszowska
 13. Dist. Południe
 X. Rożnówka
 14. Dist. Wioska Dziecięca
 XI. Bagienna
 15. Dist. Bagienna
 XII. Batorego

Historic places and buildings

 Stanisław Nowakowski's Park – an old park in the town affectionately nicknamed Małpi Gaj (English: Monkey Marsh).  It is a last relic of a Nowakowski's palace. The park was designed as a garden in the 17th century.  The original gate to the town still stands there.  The old garden keeper's cottage also survives to this day.  The same cannot be said about the small villa which stood deep in the park, but now has been completely vandalised.
 Polish Baroque Church of the Assumption of Mary from the early 17th century. The building is located on Trzeciego Maja Street, next to Plac Wolności (Market Square).
 Church of the St. George on Tadeusz Kościuszko Street, not very large building from the 19th century, former Eastern Orthodox church.
 Mary Magdalene church in Puszcza Solska district. Built in the beginning of the 1920s, surrounded by monumental objects of franciscan monastery, small bell tower and Mary Magdalene Chapel (all from the 17th century).
 Zagroda Sitarska museum – open-air museum on Nadstawna Street, built in the beginning of the 19th century. The main building is wooden home, with exhibition of traditional making sieves industry. All objects of museum are surrounded by neighbouring multi-family buildings.

Transport
Biłgoraj is located away from main Polish roads. It is a junction of two voivodeship roads - road nr. 835 (north–south, from Lublin to Przemyśl), and road nr. 858 (east–west, from Zamość to Nisko). Biłgoraj has a rail station on a secondary-importance line from Zamość to Stalowa Wola, through the town also goes the Broad Gauge Metallurgy Line.

Industry

In Biłgoraj are located a headquarter and main factories of Black Red White, leading furniture manufacturer in Poland.

Local folklore
Biłgoraj is an important center of local folklore, with highly developed folk art, regional clothes and customs. This is due to the town's location, among forests, where communication with other communities was limited. There are several “Biłgoraj-style” houses, and in the area numerous wayside shrines can be found. Biłgoraj's folklore was used by Grzegorz Ciechowski in his songs written as Grzegorz z Ciechowa. Until the 19th century, famous green Biłgoraj beer was produced in the town. Furthermore, for centuries Biłgoraj was a major national center of sieve makers. The town has a Regional Museum and an Open-air museum Zagroda Sitarska. Due to its proximity to Roztocze National Park, it is visited by a number of tourists. It also has a Baroque church of Holy Trinity (17th century) and 12 different monuments.

International relations

Twin towns - sister cities
Biłgoraj is twinned with:
   Afula in Israel
   Bílina in Czech Republic
   Crailsheim in Germany
   Kelmė in Lithuania
   Stropkov in Slovakia
  Novovolynsk in Ukraine

Former twin towns:
  Kruhlaye in Belarus

Cooperation with Belarusian town was ended due to Belarusian involvement in 2022 Russian invasion of Ukraine.

Notable residents

 Shmuel Atzmon-Wircer (born 1929), creator of Yiddishpiel Theatre in Israel
 Konrad Bartoszewski (1914–1987), writer, commander of a partisan unit during World War II
 Isaac Bashevis Singer (1902–1991), Polish-American writer, Nobel Prize winner, he lived in Biłgoraj when he was young; his mother was born in Biłgoraj and the town and villages surrounding the area are featured in many of his stories and novels
 Justyna Bąk (born 1974), former 3000 meters steeplechase world record holder
 Shmuel Ben-Artzi (1914–2011), Israeli writer, poet and educator, and the father in-law of the Israeli prime minister Benjamin Netanyahu
 Michał Chodara (born 1986), handball player
 Edward Drescher (1912–1977), physician, surgeon
 Joanna Kaczor (born 1984), volleyball player
 Marzena Karpińska (born 1988), weightlifter
 Harry Keitel, father of actor Harvey Keitel
 Stefan Knapp (1921–1996), painter
 Janusz Palikot (born 1964), politician and businessman
 Mordechai Rokeach (1902–1949), known as Mordechai of Bilgoray, Rav of Biłgoraj before World War II
 Maria Śliwka (1935–1997), volleyball player
 Roman Tokarczyk (born 1942), lawyer, philosopher
 Kazimierz Węgrzyn (born 1967), footballer

See also
 Biłgoraj pierogi - regional dish from Biłgoraj

References

External links

 Official website 
 Jewish community of Biłgoraj on Virtual Shtetl
 Biłgoraj at JewishGen
 Biłgoraj at Jewish Virtual Library

Populated places established in 1578
Cities and towns in Lublin Voivodeship
Biłgoraj County
Lesser Poland
Kholm Governorate
Lublin Voivodeship (1919–1939)
Holocaust locations in Poland